Michael Edward George Tucker (30 November 1944 – 28 March 2018) was a British equestrian rider, who was better known more as Britain's main equestrian (eventing) commentator.

Career
He competed in eventing.

He was on the board of British Eventing from 1999–2005. He worked with the International Federation for Equestrian Sports (FEI). He designed horse eventing courses. In April 2017 Tucker announced that he was retiring from commentating bowing out at the 2017 Badminton Horse Trials.

Personal life
He lived in Cotswold District at Long Newnton. He was a beef farmer, with Wagyu cattle. He was married to Angela. He took part in the Duke of Beaufort's Hunt.

He died suddenly on 28 March 2018 at the age of 73.

See also
 :Category:Equestrian sports in the United Kingdom
 British Equestrian Federation

References

External links
 Cotswold Life
 Wagyu Beef

1944 births
2018 deaths
BBC sports presenters and reporters
20th-century British farmers
British sports broadcasters
English male equestrians
Place of birth missing
Equestrian commentators
British event riders
People from Cotswold District
21st-century British farmers